The province of Qandahar was an eastern province of Safavid Iran centered around the city of Qandahar, and one of the four provinces of the Khorasan administrative region. It was composed of eight lower-ranking dependencies, Bost-Gereskh, Zamindavar, K.ri (Duki?), Y.ki (Chutiyali?), Garmsir-e Qandahar, Ghuriyan and the tribal district of the Hazaras, which included Qalat.

List of governors 
This is a list of the known figures who governed Qandahar. Beglerbeg, hakem and vali were all administrative titles designating the governor.

References

Sources 
 
 

Qandahar
16th century in Iran
17th century in Iran
18th century in Iran
Qandahar
History of Kandahar